In Greek mythology, Thespius (Ancient Greek: Θέσπιος Théspios) or Thestius (Ancient Greek: Θέστιος) was a legendary founder and king of Thespiae, Boeotia. His life account is considered part of Greek mythology.

Biography
Thespius was reportedly son of Erechtheus, King of Athens, and possibly Praxithea, daughter of Phrasimus and Diogeneia. He was probably the brother of Protogeneia, Pandora, Procris, Creusa, Oreithyia, Chthonia, Merope, Cecrops, Pandorus, Metion, Orneus, Eupalamus and Sicyon. Other sources called him a descendant of Erechtheus while some said that he was the son of Teuthras, son of Pandion or Cepheus.

Thespius' maternal grandparents were Phrasimus and Diogenia, the daughter of the river god Cephissus. He married Megamede, daughter of Arneus. They supposedly had fifty daughters together, although Thespius may have fathered some of the daughters from unnamed mistresses with Megamede being their stepmother. The daughters are often referred to as the Thespiades, also being the subject of an 1853 painting by Gustave Moreau.

Mythology 
All his daughters came of marrying age but Thespius seems to have sought no husband for them; he instead desired grandchildren from the hero Heracles. When Heracles was assigned to kill a lion (not to be confused with the Nemean Lion), Thespius offered his fifty daughters as a prize. The hunt for the lion lasted fifty days, and during each night of the hunt Heracles slept with each of the fifty daughters, who in turn each gave birth to one son.

Alternate sources claim that Heracles slept with the daughters in a single night. In this version, only forty-nine slept with the hero, with the fiftieth being destined to serve as a virgin priestess of a temple to Heracles, as a punishment for her refusal to sleep with him.  In another version, there were fifty-one grandsons of Thespius, forty of which colonized the island of Sardinia.

Descendants

The Bibliotheca of Pseudo-Apollodorus lists the following daughters and grandchildren. The grandchildren were all Heracleidae in the wider sense of the term.

According to Hellanicus, a certain Sthephanephoros ("crown bearer") was called one of the sons of Heracles who were born from the daughters of Thestios.

Notes

References 

 Apollodorus, The Library with an English Translation by Sir James George Frazer, F.B.A., F.R.S. in 2 Volumes, Cambridge, MA, Harvard University Press; London, William Heinemann Ltd. 1921. . Online version at the Perseus Digital Library. Greek text available from the same website.
Diodorus Siculus, The Library of History translated by Charles Henry Oldfather. Twelve volumes. Loeb Classical Library. Cambridge, Massachusetts: Harvard University Press; London: William Heinemann, Ltd. 1989. Vol. 3. Books 4.59–8. Online version at Bill Thayer's Web Site
 Diodorus Siculus, Bibliotheca Historica. Vol 1-2. Immanel Bekker. Ludwig Dindorf. Friedrich Vogel. in aedibus B. G. Teubneri. Leipzig. 1888-1890. Greek text available at the Perseus Digital Library.
 Lucius Mestrius Plutarchus, Lives with an English Translation by Bernadotte Perrin. Cambridge, MA. Harvard University Press. London. William Heinemann Ltd. 1914. 1. Online version at the Perseus Digital Library. Greek text available from the same website.

 Pausanias, Description of Greece with an English Translation by W.H.S. Jones, Litt.D., and H.A. Ormerod, M.A., in 4 Volumes. Cambridge, MA, Harvard University Press; London, William Heinemann Ltd. 1918. . Online version at the Perseus Digital Library
 Pausanias, Graeciae Descriptio. 3 vols. Leipzig, Teubner. 1903.  Greek text available at the Perseus Digital Library.
 Stephanus of Byzantium, Stephani Byzantii Ethnicorum quae supersunt, edited by August Meineike (1790-1870), published 1849. A few entries from this important ancient handbook of place names have been translated by Brady Kiesling. Online version at the Topos Text Project.
 Suida, Suda Encyclopedia translated by Ross Scaife, David Whitehead, William Hutton, Catharine Roth, Jennifer Benedict, Gregory Hays, Malcolm Heath Sean M. Redmond, Nicholas Fincher, Patrick Rourke, Elizabeth Vandiver, Raphael Finkel, Frederick Williams, Carl Widstrand, Robert Dyer, Joseph L. Rife, Oliver Phillips and many others. Online version at the Topos Text Project.
 Zimmerman, John Edward, Dictionary of Classical Mythology, Bantam Books, 1966. .
Princes in Greek mythology
Kings in Greek mythology
Attican characters in Greek mythology
Mythology of Heracles
Boeotian mythology